Black's Store, also known as the  Brettun & Black Museum, is an historic building located in Hampton, Illinois, United States. The mercantile store was built in 1849 and was the largest store in Northwest Illinois when it opened. It is a three-story brick structure that had one of the first elevators in the Midwest. Preservationist Ron Nelson of Bishop Hill, Illinois restored the elevator in recent years.  The store served as a riverboat stop and later as a stop on the Galena Stagecoach.

The Brettun & Black Museum recreates the 1849 store. It was listed on the National Register of Historic Places in 1976.

References

External links
 Hampton history

Commercial buildings completed in 1849
Culture of the Quad Cities
Tourist attractions in the Quad Cities
National Register of Historic Places in Rock Island County, Illinois
Commercial buildings on the National Register of Historic Places in Illinois
Museums in Rock Island County, Illinois
1849 establishments in Illinois